Dr. Faisal Abbas (born 1955) is a former Minister of Transport for Syria, serving from 2011 to 2012.

Early life, education and career
Abbas was born in Hama Governorate in 1955. He earned a bachelor's degree in electrical engineering from the University of Damascus in 1977, a master's degree in electrical engineering from Ohio State University in 1982, and a Ph.D. in computer engineering from the same university in 1986. 

Abbas was a professor in the Department of Computer Engineering and Automation at the Faculty of Mechanical and Electrical Engineering at the University of Damascus until 2001. From 2000-2007 he was the Dean of the electrical engineering faculty (department) of the University of Damascus. In 2007 he was appointed Rector (President) of the International University for Science and Technology.

National Director of the project to establish a network of Higher Education and Scientific Research from 1998-2000
Visiting professor and researcher in the Department of Electrical and Computer Engineering at the University of Detroit in Michigan in 1999
Member of the Board of Directors of Syrian Computer Society - Secretary 2000-2005
Member of the National Centre for Energy Research from 2004 to 2009
Member of the Committee on Quality Assurance in Higher Education in 2008
Member of the Board of Higher Education 2008-2009
Director of the Directorate of Computer and Information Technology in the Ministry of Higher Education

Personal life
Abbas is married and has two sons.

See also
Cabinet of Syria

References

Minister of Transport Dr. Fayssal Abbas, SANA
Biography of the new Syrian government 2011 - the names and lives of government ministers , Syria FM, 17 April 2011

External links
Ministry of Transport official government website

1955 births
Living people
Damascus University alumni
Ohio State University College of Engineering alumni
Transport ministers of Syria
People from Hama Governorate